Victoria Wood (retitled Victoria Wood Presents from 2007 for its DVD release) is a series of six one-off situation comedies written by and starring Victoria Wood in 1989, who took a break from sketches, two years after her successful sketch series Victoria Wood: As Seen on TV. Wood appeared as a fictionalised version of herself in all six episodes; she was generally identified only as "Victoria", but in the first episode was also addressed as "Miss Wood". Her real-life career was occasionally a plot point: in "The Library", it was said that she "worked in TV", and in Over To Pam characters recognised her as a comedian, though two confused her with Dawn French. Most notably, in the final episode, Staying In, she was taken to a party to perform as a stand-up comedian. Her character sometimes broke the fourth wall of TV and spoke directly to the camera, but not in every episode.

Production
Bored with the sketch format and with a yearning to recapture her previous success as a playwright, Wood came up with six individual sitcoms as a compromise. She admitted to finding the writing difficult. Though Wood was written as the central character, other lead parts were written with specific actresses in mind, such as Julie Walters and Una Stubbs. She said of the characters, "I want people to like me and the people who play my friends, and not everybody else."

Unlike As Seen on TV, the show was not filmed in front of a studio audience, though the recordings were later played for an audience to record a laugh track. Wood regretted this decision as it deprived her of the "instant gratification" of an audience response, and described the filming as a "boring, diabolical and awful" experience.

Reception
The series was met with a mixed critical reception. The series started out with an impressive 13 million viewers tuning in, but by the next week dropped to 11 million. The Daily Express called the show "tiresome stuff", while the Daily Mirror said Wood's targets were "predictable and snobbish". Wood later acknowledged, "It wasn't as well written by me as it could have been, and I shouldn't have been in all the sketches." In retrospect, Screenonline was more positive in its review, saying, "Modest in ambition and scale but rich in wit and acuity, the six playlets showcase Wood's eye for human foibles and her distinctively eccentric characters."

Episode guide

Home media

VHS and DVDs

Script collection

On 13 September 1990, the scripts of all six shows were published by Methuen London as Mens Sana in Thingummy Doodah, and Other Nuggets of Homely Fun. The book is dedicated "To all the Old Bags in Equity, most of whom were in the series". The book contains a preface by Wood about what it's like to make a TV programme:

References

External links

Radio Times Guide To TV Comedy on 'Victoria Wood'

BBC television sitcoms
1989 British television series debuts
1989 British television series endings
1980s British television sketch shows
Television shows written by Victoria Wood